Phyllospadix torreyi, Torrey's surfgrass, is a plant species found along the Pacific Coasts of British Columbia, Washington, Oregon, California and Baja California (including Guadalupe Island). It grows in salt marshes in the intertidal zones.

Phyllospadix torreyi is a grass-like plant with toothless leaves up to 60 cm long.

Phyllospadix torreyi is the obligate host to the epiphytes, Melobesia mediocris and Smithora naiadum.

References

torreyi
Salt marsh plants
Flora of British Columbia
Flora of Washington (state)
Flora of Oregon
Flora of California
Flora of Baja California
Flora of Mexican Pacific Islands
Biota of the Pacific Ocean
Plants described in 1879
Flora without expected TNC conservation status